Graphite Peak is a peak,  high, standing at the northeast end of a ridge running  northeast from Mount Clarke, just south of the head of Falkenhof Glacier in Antarctica. It was so named by the New Zealand Geological Survey Antarctic Expedition (1961–62) because of the graphite found on the peak.

References

Mountains of the Ross Dependency
Dufek Coast